Elections to the Mizoram Legislative Assembly were held in November 2003 to elect members of the 40 constituencies in Mizoram, India. The Mizo National Front won the most seats and its leader, Zoramthanga was appointed as the Chief Minister of Mizoram for his second term.

Result

Elected Members

See also 
 List of constituencies of the Mizoram Legislative Assembly
 2003 elections in India

References

Mizoram
2003
2003